Loose Boots is honeyhoney's first release and their only EP, released on February 26, 2008, on Ironworks. Keifer Sutherland, founder of Ironworks, starred in the video of "Little Toy Gun", playing a disheveled gambler who runs into the wrong woman, played by lead singer Suzanne Santo.

Track listing

References

Honeyhoney albums
2008 EPs